The Château de Crestet is a castle in the commune of Crestet in the Vaucluse département of France.

History
Construction began between 840 and 850. It was a summer residence of the Bishops of Vaison-la-Romaine. In 1160, Raymond VI, Count of Toulouse, seized the castle at Vaison and drove out the bishops who came to the castle at Crestet. In 1189, Raymond VI also seized Crestet.

During the 14th century, the castle was remodelled as evidence of Gothic architecture are still visible. During the French Revolution, the castle was sacked and much of its furniture burned. Abandoned, the castle was used as a quarry by local people. During the Second World War, (at the end of 1943, beginning of 1944), a German unit of about twenty men occupied the castle and surrounded it with barbed wire. They slept in houses in the village.

Restoration
In 1979, the noted French architect, Roger Anger (1923 – 2008), designer of the city of Auroville in India acquired the castle and in 1985 undertook its consolidation and restoration on which he worked until his death.

See also
List of castles in France

References

Castles in Provence-Alpes-Côte d'Azur
Ruined castles in France